The 1935 state election in Queensland, Australia was held on 11 May 1935.

By-elections
 On 29 April 1933, James Bayley (CPNP) was elected to succeed Walter Barnes (CPNP), who had died on 19 February, as the member for Wynnum.
 On 15 July 1933, Samuel Brassington (Labor) was elected to succeed Thomas Wilson (Labor), who had died on 19 May, as the member for Fortitude Valley.
 On 9 December 1933, Roy Bell (CPNP) was elected to succeed Ernest Grimstone (CPNP), who had died on 22 October, as the member for Stanley.
 On 18 August 1934, James Annand (CPNP) was elected to succeed Robert Roberts (CPNP), who had died on 2 June, as the member for East Toowoomba.

Retiring Members

Labor
George Barber MLA (Bundaberg)

CPNP
George Barnes MLA (Warwick)
Jens Peterson MLA (Fitzroy)
Hubert Sizer MLA (Sandgate)
Jim Sparkes MLA (Dalby)
Edward Swayne MLA (Mirani)

Independent
Arnold Wienholt MLA (Fassifern)

Candidates
Sitting members at the time of the election are shown in bold text.

See also
 1935 Queensland state election
 Members of the Queensland Legislative Assembly, 1932–1935
 Members of the Queensland Legislative Assembly, 1935–1938
 List of political parties in Australia

References
 

Candidates for Queensland state elections